Neyman construction, named after Jerzy Neyman, is a frequentist method to construct an interval at a confidence level  such that if we repeat the experiment many times the interval will contain the true value of some parameter a fraction  of the time.

Theory 
Assume  are random variables with joint pdf , which depends on k unknown parameters. For convenience, let  be the sample space defined by the n random variables and subsequently define a sample point in the sample space as 

Neyman originally proposed defining two functions  and  such that for any sample point,,
 
 L and U are single valued and defined.
These calculated probabilities fail to draw meaningful inference about  since the probability is simply zero or unity. Furthermore, under the frequentist construct the model parameters are unknown constants and not permitted to be random variables. 
For example if , then . Likewise, if , then 

As Neyman describes in his 1937 paper, suppose that we consider all points in the sample space, that is, which are a system of random variables defined by the joint pdf described above.

Under the frequentist construct the model parameters are unknown constants and not permitted to be random variables.

Coverage probability
The coverage probability, for Neyman construction is the frequency of experiments in which the confidence interval contains the actual value of interest. Generally, the coverage probability is set to a  confidence. For Neyman construction, the coverage probability is set to some value  where . This value  tells how confident we are that the true value will be contained in the interval.

Implementation
A Neyman construction can be carried out by performing multiple experiments that construct data sets corresponding to a given value of the parameter. The experiments are fitted with conventional methods, and the space of fitted parameter values constitutes the band which the confidence interval can be selected from.

Classic example  

 
 
where  is the standard error, and the sample mean and standard deviation are:
 
 
The factor  follows a t distribution with (n-1) degrees of freedom, ~t

Another Example
 are iid random variables, and let . Suppose . Now to construct a confidence interval with  level of confidence. So, 
 
 
    
This produces a  confidence interval for  where,
 
 .

See also
Probability interpretations

References 

Estimation methods